Abdulmohsen Al-Qahtani (born 5 June 1999) is a Saudi Arabian footballer who plays as a midfielder for Saudi Arabian club Al-Raed.

Honours

International
Saudi Arabia U20
AFC U-19 Championship: 2018

References

1999 births
Living people
People from Khobar
Saudi Arabian footballers
Association football midfielders
Al-Qadsiah FC players
Al-Raed FC players
Saudi Professional League players
Saudi First Division League players
Saudi Arabia youth international footballers
Olympic footballers of Saudi Arabia
Saudi Arabia international footballers